The National Federation of Australia Japan Societies (NFAJS) is a federation of societies that promote the importance of the relationship between the peoples of Japan and Australia.

Memberships

Australian Capital Territory

  Australia-Japan Society Inc

New South Wales

 Australia-Japan Society of NSW Inc
 Australia-Japan Society of Coffs Harbour
 Cowra Japan Society

Northern Territory

 Australian-Japanese Association of the NT Inc.

Queensland

 Australia-Japan Society Queensland Inc
 Australia-Japan Society Far North Queensland
 Australia-Japan Society Sunshine Coast
 Australia-Japan Society Townsville

South Australia

 Australia Japan Association of South Australia
 Japan Australia Friendship Association

Tasmania

 Australia Japan Society (Tasmania) Inc.

Victoria

 Australia-Japan Society of Victoria Inc

Western Australia

 Australia-Japan Society – Western Australia Inc.
 Australia-Japan Society – Geraldton
 Australia-Japan Society – Broome
 Australia-Japan Society – Bunbury

References

External links
 National Federation of Australia Japan Societies

1975 establishments in Australia
Japanese-Australian culture
Japan in non-Japanese culture
Australia friendship associations
Cultural organizations based in Japan
Japan friendship associations